Frits Landesbergen (born 1961 in Voorschoten) is a Dutch jazz drummer and vibraphonist.

Private life
Since about 2003 he has been in a relationship with Joke Bruijs. The made an album together and his marriage was ending and her marriage had ended. He is younger by eleven years.

References

External links
Official Website

1961 births
Living people
Dutch jazz drummers
Male drummers
People from Voorschoten
Male jazz musicians
Jazz vibraphonists